Sheikhupura Stadium is a multi-purpose stadium in Sheikhupura, Pakistan.  It is currently used mostly for cricket matches.  The stadium holds 15,000 people and hosted its first Test match in 1996, when Pakistan played Zimbabwe. This was followed by another test a year later between Pakistan and South Africa.

Sheikhupura Stadium has hosted two one-day internationals so far, both between Pakistan and Zimbabwe, both teams winning a match.

International centuries

Test centuries

The following table summarises the Test centuries scored at Sheikhupura Stadium.

One Day International centuries

The following table summarises the One Day International centuries scored at Sheikhupura Stadium.

List of Five Wicket Hauls

Tests
The following table summarises the One Day International five wicket hauls taken at Sheikhupura Stadium.

See also
 List of stadiums in Pakistan

References

Test cricket grounds in Pakistan
Sport in Sheikhupura
Stadiums in Pakistan
Cricket grounds in Pakistan
Cricket in Sheikhupura